Submarine Cable Act of 1888 is a United States federal statute defining penalties for intentional and unintentional disturbances of submarine communications cable in international waters. The Act of Congress acknowledge the Convention for the Protection of Submarine Telegraph Cable of 1884 necessitating the international cooperation for the safeguard of international communication cables placed on the ocean floor.

The legislation was passed by the 50th United States Congressional session and confirmed as a federal law by the 24th President of the United States Grover Cleveland on February 29, 1888.

Provisions of the Act
The 1888 Act was penned as thirteen sections establishing rulings for the protection of oceanic basin telegraph cables.

47 U.S.C. § 1 ~ Punishment for injuries intentionally done
47 U.S.C. § 2 ~ Penalty for culpable negligence
47 U.S.C. § 3 ~ Saving life
47 U.S.C. § 4 ~ Observance of cable ships & signals
47 U.S.C. § 5 ~ Fishing vessels
47 U.S.C. § 6 ~ Officers authorized
47 U.S.C. § 7 ~ Penalties for refusing to show papers
47 U.S.C. § 8 ~ Suits for damages
47 U.S.C. § 9 ~ Liability of master
47 U.S.C. § 10 ~ Definition of terms
47 U.S.C. § 11 ~ Summary trials
47 U.S.C. § 12 ~ Application
47 U.S.C. § 13 ~ Jurisdiction

Concession of Transatlantic Communications
The 18th President of the United States Ulysses Grant was the first public official advising the post-civil war states of the proposed wired communications between the coasts of America and France.

December 6, 1869: First Annual Message to the Senate and House of Representatives

December 7, 1875: Seventh Annual Message to the Senate and House of Representatives

Wartime Discretion
On April 6, 1917, the United States Congress passed a joint resolution declaring American entry into World War I. On April 28, 1917, the 28th President of the United States Woodrow Wilson issued Executive Order 2604 discontinuing the transmission of international communications.

Act of 1921
The Submarine Cable Act of 1921 appended Title 47 Telegraphy implementing licensing requirements for the coastal landing and operations of submarine cables along the United States coastal zones.

See also

Pioneers of Intercontinental Communications and Submersible Telegraph Cable

References

Pictorial of Transatlantic Communications Telegraph

Reading Bibliography

External links
 
 
 
 
 
 
 
 

1888 in law
1888 in American law
50th United States Congress
1888 in the United States